The 1978 Kansas Jayhawks football team represented the University of Kansas in the Big Eight Conference during the 1978 NCAA Division I-A football season. In their fourth and final season under head coach Bud Moore, the Jayhawks compiled a 1–10 record (0–7 against conference opponents), finished in last place in the conference, and were outscored by opponents by a combined total of 346 to 172. They played their home games at Memorial Stadium in Lawrence, Kansas.

Schedule

References

Kansas
Kansas Jayhawks football seasons
Kansas Jayhawks football